Rolandas Valiūnas (born 13 January 1965 in Kybartai, Vilkaviškis District Municipality) is a Lithuanian business lawyer and consultant, Attorney at law, Co-Founder and Managing Partner of "Ellex Valiūnas ir partneriai". He is an Honorary Consul of Thailand (since 2004).

Biography 

From 1971 to 1982 Rolandas Valiūnas learned at the 5th Middle school Marijampolė, where he graduated with the gold medal (with distinction). After the Soviet army service he studied law in the graduate studies from 1984 to 1989 at the Law Faculty of Vilnius University. Then he continued his education in 1994 at the Queen Mary & Westfield Coledge, in 1996 at the Academy of International Law in Dallas, Texas. From 1999 to 2000 he studied at the Baltic Management Institute (BMI), the Executive Master of Business Administration (EMBA) program (2000). After that, he was a lecturer in the course of the BMI Institute "Corporate Governance".

Since 1990 Valiūnas is a lawyer. From 1989 to 1991 he worked in the first law firm in Vilnius, from 1991 to 1992 at the law firm "Foresta", in 1992 at the law firm "Lideika, Petrauskas, Valiūnas ir partneriai" (LPVP) as managing partner.

According to "The International Who's Who of Business Lawyers", Rolandas Valiūnas is one of the best Lithuanian lawyers in the area of Corporate Governance, Mergers and acquisitions. He contributed to the national and international conferences regarding business law topics and has authored and was co-author of numerous legal publications in the business press (Verslo žinios etc.).

Rolandas Valiūnas is CEO of BMI and Investors' Forum in Lithuania, Vice President of ICC Lietuva.

Family and personal life 
Rolandas Valiūnas is married to a gynecologist Renata Valiūnienė.

Rolandas Valiūnas has the sons Mantas Gabrielius Valiūnas and Giedrius Valiūnas (* 1989).

Rolandas Valiūnas has daughters Grytė Marija and Elzė Gintvilė.

Membership
2010 – to date Advisory Board, Law Firm Management Committee, International Bar Association (IBA)
2007 – to date Advisory Board, European Regional Forum, IBA
2006 to date – Board Member, Vilnius Court of Commercial Arbitration
2004 - 2006 Co-Chair, European Regional Forum, IBA
2002 - 2005 Deputy Chairman, Council of Lithuanian Bar Association
2000 - 2005 Member of General Professional Program Committee, IBA
1998 to date - Board Member, Legal clinic of Vilnius University
1995 to date - Recommended arbitrator of Vilnius Court of Commercial Arbitration
1994 - 1997 President, Lithuanian Young Bar Association (LJAA)
1991 - 2000 - Vice-President, Union Internationale des Avocats (UIA)

References

Living people
1965 births
People from Kybartai
Vilnius University alumni
Lithuanian art collectors
21st-century art collectors
Lawyers from Vilnius
Lithuanian consultants
Businesspeople from Vilnius
Honorary consuls to Lithuania
21st-century diplomats
Honorary consuls of Thailand
20th-century Lithuanian lawyers
21st-century Lithuanian lawyers